The Vakil Mosque ( - Masjed-e Vakil) is a mosque in Shiraz, southern Iran, situated to the west of the Vakil Bazaar next to its entrance. This mosque was built between 1751 and 1773, during the Zand period; however, it was restored in the 19th century during the Qajar period. Vakil means regent, which was the title used by Karim Khan, the founder of Zand Dynasty. Shiraz was the seat of Karim Khan's government and he endowed many buildings, including this mosque.

Specifications
Vakil Mosque covers an area of 8,660 square meters. It has only two iwans instead of the usual four, on the northern and southern sides of a large open court. The iwans and court are decorated with typical Shirazi haft rangi tiles, a characteristic feature of the art and industry of Shiraz during the latter half of the 18th century. Its night prayer hall (Shabestan), with an area of approximately 2,700 square meters, contains 48 monolithic pillars carved in spirals, each with a capital of acanthus leaves. The minbar in this hall is cut from a solid piece of green marble with a flight of 14 steps and is considered to be one of the master pieces of the Zand period. The exuberant floral decorative tiles largely date from the Qajar period.

Gallery

See also
List of Mosques in Iran

References

External links

 360 Panoramic Image of Vakil Mosque
 Vakil Mosque Pictures
 3D Vakil Mosque : Monshizadeh

Mosques in Shiraz
Religious buildings and structures completed in 1773